Breukeleveen is a hamlet in the Dutch province of North Holland. It is in the municipality of Wijdemeren, and lies southwest of Loosdrecht.

The hamlet consists of a single street between two lakes. At the north end, it borders the hamlet of Muyeveld, and on the south end it borders Tienhoven, Stichtse Vecht, in the province of Utrecht.

The hamlet is named after the nearby town of Breukelen.

References 

Populated places in North Holland
Wijdemeren